The Canton of Neufchâtel-en-Bray is a canton situated in the Seine-Maritime département and in the Normandy region of north-western France.

Geography 
An area of farming, forestry and light industry in the arrondissement of Dieppe, centred on the town of Neufchâtel-en-Bray.

Composition 
At the French canton reorganisation which came into effect in March 2015, the canton was expanded from 23 to 69 communes:

Ardouval
Auvilliers
Avesnes-en-Val
Bailleul-Neuville
Baillolet
Beaumont-le-Hareng
Bellencombre
Bosc-Bérenger
Bosc-le-Hard
Bosc-Mesnil
Bouelles
Bracquetuit
Bradiancourt
Bully
Bures-en-Bray
Callengeville
Clais
Cottévrard
La Crique
Critot
Croixdalle
Cropus
Esclavelles
Fesques
Flamets-Frétils
Fontaine-en-Bray
Fréauville
Fresles
Fresnoy-Folny
Grandcourt
Les Grandes-Ventes
Graval
Grigneuseville
Londinières
Lucy
Massy
Mathonville
Maucomble
Ménonval
Mesnières-en-Bray
Mesnil-Follemprise
Montérolier
Mortemer
Nesle-Hodeng
Neufbosc
Neufchâtel-en-Bray
Neuville-Ferrières
Osmoy-Saint-Valery
Pommeréval
Preuseville
Puisenval
Quièvrecourt
Rocquemont
Rosay
Sainte-Agathe-d'Aliermont
Sainte-Beuve-en-Rivière
Sainte-Geneviève
Saint-Hellier
Saint-Germain-sur-Eaulne
Saint-Martin-l'Hortier
Saint-Martin-Osmonville
Saint-Pierre-des-Jonquières
Saint-Saëns
Saint-Saire
Smermesnil
Sommery
Vatierville 
Ventes-Saint-Rémy
Wanchy-Capval

Population

See also 
 Arrondissements of the Seine-Maritime department
 Cantons of the Seine-Maritime department
 Communes of the Seine-Maritime department

References

Neufchatel-en-Bray